Bacabal Esporte Clube, also known as Bacabal, are a Brazilian football team from Bacabal, Maranhão. They competed in the Série C in 1995 and in 2008.

History
Bacabal Esporte Clube were founded on March 12, 1974. They won the Campeonato Maranhense in 1996, after beating Sampaio Corrêa and Caxiense in the final stage. Bacabal competed in the Série C in 1995, and in 2008, being eliminated in the first stage in both seasons.

Stadium
Bacabal play their home games at Estádio José Luís Correa (Correão). The stadium has a maximum capacity of 12,000 people.

Achievements

 Campeonato Maranhense:
 Winners (1): 1996

References

Association football clubs established in 1974
Football clubs in Maranhão
1974 establishments in Brazil